Dayton is a town in Waupaca County, Wisconsin, United States. The population was 2,674 at the 2020 census. The unincorporated communities of Little Hope, Parfreyville, and Rural are located in the town. The census-designated place of Chain O' Lake is also partially located within the town.

History
The town was named for Lyman Dayton, a Connecticut native who moved to the area in 1850.

Geography
According to the United States Census Bureau, the town has a total area of 36.4 square miles (94.2 km2), of which, 35.2 square miles (91.2 km2) of it is land and 1.1 square miles (3.0 km2) of it (3.16%) is water.

Demographics
As of the census of 2020, there were 2,674 people residing in the town. The racial makeup of the town included 93.6% White, 0.7% African American, 1.4% Native American, 1.1% Asian, and 0.2% Hawaiian or Pacific Islander. Hispanic or Latino of any race were 2.0% of the population.

Notable people

 Andrew R. Potts, Wisconsin state legislator and farmer, was born in Rural, in the Town of Dayton; Potts served as chairman of the Dayton Town Board

Images

References

External links

 Town of Dayton, Wisconsin

Towns in Waupaca County, Wisconsin
Towns in Wisconsin